Adam Janusz Leszczyński (born 26 November 1975, Warsaw) is a Polish historian and journalist, associate professor at the Institute for Political Studies of the Polish Academy of Sciences.

Works
Skok w nowoczesność: Polityka wzrostu w krajach peryferyjnych 1943–1980 (The leap in modernity: Politics of growth in peripheral countries 1943–1980). Warszawa: Instytut Studiów Politycznych PAN. Introduction by Zygmunt Bauman

References

1975 births
Living people
Polish journalists
21st-century Polish historians
Polish male non-fiction writers
Academic staff of the Polish Academy of Sciences
University of Warsaw alumni